Mercury(I) iodide is a chemical compound of mercury and iodine. The chemical formula is Hg2I2. It is photosensitive and decomposes easily to mercury and HgI2.

Synthesis
Mercury(I) iodide can be prepared by directly reacting mercury and iodine.

Structure
In common with other Hg(I) (mercurous) compounds which contain linear X-Hg-Hg-X units, Hg2I2 contains linear IHg2I units with an Hg-Hg bond length of 272 pm (Hg-Hg in the metal is 300 pm) and an Hg-I bond length of 268 pm.  The overall coordination of each Hg atom is octahedral as it has in addition to the two nearest neighbours there are four other I atoms at 351 pm. The compound is often formulated as Hg22+ 2I−.

Historical Uses
Mercury(I) iodide was a commonly used as a drug in the 19th century, sometimes under the contemporary name of protiodide of mercury. It was used to treat a wide range of conditions; everything from acne to kidney disease and in particular was the treatment of choice for syphilis. It was available over the counter at any drugstore in the world, the most common form being a concoction of protiodide, licorice, glycerin and marshmallow.

Taken orally, and in low doses, protiodide causes excessive salivation, fetid breath, spongy and bleeding gums and sore teeth. Excessive use or an overdose causes physical weakness, loss of teeth, hemolysing (destruction of the red blood cells) of the blood and necrosis of the bones and tissues of the body. Early signs of an overdose or excessive use are muscular tremors, chorea, and locomotor ataxia. Violent bloody vomiting and voiding also occur.

Protiodide is banned as a medication, even though it persisted in use as a quack remedy until the early 20th century.

See also
Mercury(II) iodide, HgI2

References

Iodides
Metal halides
Mercury(I) compounds
Withdrawn drugs